Parammobatodes is a genus of bees belonging to the family Apidae.

The species of this genus are found in Middle East, Europe, and South Asia.

Species:

Parammobatodes craterus 
Parammobatodes indicus 
Parammobatodes maroccanus 
Parammobatodes minutus 
Parammobatodes nuristanus 
Parammobatodes rozeni

References

Apidae
Hymenoptera genera